Marcello Fois (born 1960) is an Italian writer. He was born in Nuoro in Sardinia and studied at the University of Bologna. His first novel Ferro Recente was published in 1989. A prolific author, he has also written scripts for radio, TV, film and theatre. He has won numerous prizes, including:

 1992 – Premio Italo Calvino for Picta
 1997 – Premio Dessì for Nulla
 1998 – Premio Scerbanenco for Sempre caro
 2002 – Premio Fedeli for Dura madre
 2007 – Premio Lama e trama
 2007 – Premio Super Grinzane Cavour for Memoria del vuoto
 2007 – Premio Volponi for Memoria del vuoto
 2007 – Premio Alassio Centolibri - Un Autore per l'Europa for Memoria del vuoto

Fois is considered to be a leading proponent of the "New Sardinian Literature" movement.

Selected works
Sempre caro, 1998  – The Advocate (trans. Patrick Creagh) 2003
Memoria del vuoto, 2006  – Memory of the Abyss (trans. Patrick Creagh) 2012
Stirpe, 2009 – Bloodlines (trans. Silvester Mazzarella) 2014
Nel tempo di mezzo, 2012  – The Time in Between (trans. Silvester Mazzarella) 2018
Luce perfetta, 2015 – Perfect Light (trans. Silvester Mazzarella) 2020
 Del dirsi addio, 2017 - Valse Triste (trans. Richard Dixon) 2021

References

Italian screenwriters
University of Bologna alumni
1960 births
Living people
20th-century Italian novelists
20th-century Italian male writers
21st-century Italian novelists
21st-century Italian male writers
Italian male screenwriters